Aristea ecklonii (common names: blue flies, blue stars, blue-eyed iris, blue corn-lily) is a plant species  in the Iridaceae, first described in 1866. It is native to central and southern Africa from South Africa north to Cameroon and Tanzania. The plant is an evergreen perennial with small, blue flowers, growing in clumps with upright, grass-like leaves  15–18 in (38–46 cm) in height.

It is an invasive species in high mountain forests of Sri Lanka near Nuwara Eliya and Horton Plains. 
It is also an invasive in Australia. also invasive in New Zealand where it is a pest species on the NPPA banned list.

References

Iridaceae
Flora of Africa
Invasive plant species in Sri Lanka
Plants described in 1866